Birdshot is a 2016 Philippine coming-of-age thriller film written, directed and edited by Mikhail Red. Starring Mary Joy Apostol, Arnold Reyes, Ku Aquino, and John Arcilla, its story revolves around a farm girl (Apostol) in the countryside, who unwittingly kills a Philippine eagle (an endangered species locally known as the haribon), and two police officers (Reyes and Arcilla) assigned to track down the haribon's killer while investigating the mysterious disappearance of a busload of farmers en route to Manila.

The film was selected as the Filipino entry for the Best Foreign Language Film at the 90th Academy Awards, but it was not nominated. Birdshot is the first Filipino film released worldwide by Netflix.

Plot
Diego Mariano (Ku Aquino) is the caretaker of the land surrounding a sanctuary; he is the father of 14-year-old Maya (Mary Joy Apostol), whose mother died from childbirth. Maya wants to explore the land beyond the family's isolated shack. Diego wants his daughter to be self-sufficient, so he teaches her to fire a gun. After failing her first shooting lessons, Maya wanders off to the forest sanctuary with her father's dual barrel shotgun and deliberately kills a Philippine eagle, an endangered animal.

Meanwhile, newly-recruited police officer Domingo (Arnold Reyes) goes to the area to investigate the mysterious disappearance of farmers en route to Manila on a bus, but is ordered to stop. Domingo's partner Mendoza (John Arcilla) and their commander De la Paz (Dido de la Paz) believes that Domingo should focus on finding the killer of the Philippine eagle instead.

Cast
Mary Joy Apostol as Maya
Arnold Reyes as Domingo
John Arcilla as Mendoza
Ku Aquino as Diego

Production
Birdshot was directed by Mikhail Red who also made the screenplay with cousin Rae Red. Red was also the film editor opposite Jay Halili. The cinematographer was Mycko David. The music used in the film was composed by Teresa Barrozo.

Red and his cousin began writing the script in 2014. Producer Pamela L. Reyes submitted it to the Doha Film Institute which in early 2015 granted production funding for the film. After winning the CJ Entertainment Award at the Busan Film Festival's Asian Project Market, other investors granted funding, including TBA Studios. The film project was selected at the Festival des 3 Continents' Produire au Sud workshop to improve Birdshot and its screenplay. Birdshot'''s PelikulaRED studio (owned by Reyes and Red) managed to co-produce the film with Tuko Film Productions and Buchi Boy Productions.

Red was inspired by a shooting incident in 2008, where a three-year-old Philippine eagle was shot by a Bukidnon farmer in Mount Kitanglad who cooked the killed bird afterwards. Principal photography lasted for 23 days. Scenes were shot in the provinces of Isabela and Rizal as well as the Philippine Eagle Sanctuary in Davao City.

The color red is a prominent element in the film which signifies an important scene or pertinent detail that the audience is required to pay closer attention to.

ReleaseBirdshot was first screened at film festivals outside the Philippines before it was screened in the country. The film made its debut at the 2016 Tokyo International Film Festival and was screened in 14 other film festivals before it made its local debut at the 13th Cinemalaya Independent Film Festival in August of the following year.

The film was also screened as one of the twelve official entries at the 2017 Pista ng Pelikulang Pilipino.

Streaming service Netflix acquired the film and was released on the platform on March 26, 2018 worldwide. Birdshot will become the first Filipino produced film to be made available in Netflix Philippines. Another Philippine film, On the Job, was already made available in the North America service of the online platform.

Reception
Film critic Richard Kuipers praised Birdshot in a review published in Variety'' describing the film as a "gripping combination of police procedural and coming-of-age drama". He paralleled the film's commentary to the 2009 Maguindanao massacre and remarked on Apostol's performance in particular as "impressive". Additional praise was also given by Kuiper to Teresa Barrozo's "haunting soundscapes".

The film won Best Picture in the Asian Future category at the 2016 Tokyo International Film Festival and was selected for the Ingmar Bergman International Debut Award at the Goteborg Film Festival.

See also
List of submissions to the 90th Academy Awards for Best Foreign Language Film
List of Philippine submissions for the Academy Award for Best Foreign Language Film

References

External links

2016 films
Films shot in Isabella (province)
Films shot in Rizal
Philippine coming-of-age films
Films directed by Mikhail Red